Generation Cryo is an American reality television series that premiered on November 25, 2013, on MTV. Generation Cryo chronicles 17-year-old Breeanna who discovered her 15 half-siblings via the Donor Sibling Registry. Breeanna and her 15 siblings were conceived via sperm donors. While connecting with her half-brothers and sisters, Breeanna gets everyone together to search for their biological father.

Cast
 Breeanna
 Jonah and Hilit
 Jayme and Jesse
 Paige, Molly, and Will
 Jesse

Episodes

References

2010s American reality television series
2013 American television series debuts
2013 American television series endings
English-language television shows
MTV original programming